La Matraca News is an alternative newspaper in Spanish, serving the Latino Community of Minneapolis–St. Paul metropolitan area as well as the whole state of Minnesota. It's available free every Thursday.

History 
La Matraca News began operations in 2007 as a semi-monthly publication, focused on the Latino market of the Twin Cities area. Eventually the readership grew and La Matraca News expanded to a weekly run reaching the whole state of Minnesota as well as some cities in western Wisconsin. Today La Matraca News is the most popular printed publication in Spanish in Minnesota

Gallery

References

External links

Newspapers published in Minnesota
Alternative weekly newspapers published in the United States
Newspapers published in Minneapolis–Saint Paul, Minnesota